Koit Prants (born 18 October 1961) is an Estonian politician. He was a member of X Riigikogu and was the mayor of the former Laeva Parish.

References

Living people
1961 births
People's Union of Estonia politicians
Members of the Riigikogu, 2003–2007
Place of birth missing (living people)
Mayors of places in Estonia